Richard Anthony Grissom Jr. (born November 10, 1960) is an American serial killer who, over eight days in June 1989, murdered three young women in Johnson County, Kansas. Grissom, who years earlier had been imprisoned for killing his neighbor, was convicted of the three murders and sentenced to life in prison. The bodies of the women have never been found.

Early life 
Richard Anthony Grissom Jr. was born on an American military installation in South Korea, the son of a US army Sergeant and a South Korean woman, on November 10, 1960. Its unknown what his original name was, but soon after his birth his family gave him up to an orphanage, where three years later he was adopted by US army Sergeant Richard Grissom Sr. and his wife Fredonia. Afterwards the family moved to the United States. Even there, his new family moved across numerous states before finally settling in Kansas state. Details of his childhood are not exactly known, but after his family moved to Leavenworth in the mid-1970s, Grissom enrolled at Leavenworth High School, where he gained popularity as a friendly, good looking, and smart kid who regularly got As and Bs and was a halfback for his school's football team.

Murder of Hazel Meeker 
On the morning of January 27, 1977, Grissom left his home after an argument with his parents. Sometime after leaving, he stole a railroad spike, which he used to break into the home of his neighbor, 72-year-old Hazel Meeker. In the house he attacked Meeker, viciously beating her until her death, then left the house. Meeker's granddaughter, Carla, went to visit her grandmother, but found her dead body in a pool of blood. She contacted the police who showed up and conducted an investigation. Police discovered that there were footprints in the snow all around the house, and they subsequently followed the trail which led them to the southern railroad tracks. They continued to follow them until they ended right where Grissom was hiding in a trailer park. When they noticed him, Grissom attempted to bury a handgun he had stolen from another home under the snow, but police handcuffed him before he could.

In police custody, Grissom confessed to the murder and added that he had lost one of his shoes in the creek while running from the home. Police later went back to the area but could not locate it, but took his word as when he was arrested, he was only wearing one shoe. In April 1977 Grissom, since he was 16 years old, was convicted under a juvenile court and was sent to be housed at a Boys Industrial Center in Topeka. In February 1979, Grissom and two other juveniles escaped from the center and were on the run for about a day. During this time they broke into a home in Jefferson County. They were recaptured without resentence, with the superintendent of the youth center filing a juvenile delinquency charge against Grissom.

Release and later years 
Grissom was released in 1980, and soon after enrolled at Kansas State University. In September Grissom traveled to Manhattan where he applied for the track team. During practice he garnered the nickname "rock man" for the fact that he would fall on almost every jump. By October Grissom quit the track team and instead took up racquetball, where he was regarded as a star competitor. He also took up a job at Arby's. The following year he joined the softball team. In 1982 Grissom was listed in the student directory as a sophomore studying architecture. In November 1982, a month before the final exams, Grissom stole $190 from a Manhattan resume service. He was arrested in January 1983, and two months later pleaded no contest to a theft charge was given a suspended sentence and was placed on a three-year probation. Afterwards Grissom drifted between Kansas City and Manhattan. In 1984 Grissom stole a Mazda RX-7, for which he was sentenced to serve time in prison. In June 1988 he was paroled.

Johnson County disappearances 
On June 8, 1989, Grissom, who presented himself as Randy Rodriguez, rented a storage locker in southern Johnson County, which was to remain his until July 1. Afterwards, in just over a week's span, three young women all in their early twenties went missing in Johnson County. The first of these cases was 24-year-old Joan Marie Butler of Overland Park. On June 18, she visited a friend's house in Kansas City on the Country Club Plaza. That was last time anyone heard from her, as when she failed to show up for work the following day she was reported missing. On June 25, her rental car was spotted at an apartment complex with witnesses recalling seeing a man fleeing the car. In the car police located a single blood stain. The following day two roommates, Theresa Brown and Christine Rusch, both 22, hosted a party which was meant to be a farewell to Brown as she was moving out. The next day, when the two did not show up for work, they were reported missing.

Investigation and arrest 
Police were able to pinpoint Grissom as a suspect after he was identified as a person spotted on surveillance cameras using Butler's bank card. Since police had no evidence of a kidnapping, authorities charged Grissom with one count of theft, but since he had not yet been located, police alerted the public. At the same time, friends of Brown and Rusch saw Grissom's photo and identified him as a man who attended Brown's going away party. Detectives learned that on the same day Brown and Rusch disappeared Grissom rented a second storage locker along with a woman identifying herself as Brown in Stanley. Approximately a couple hours later bank surveillance captured Rusch on video withdrawing money from an ATM.

In late June, law enforcement received a warrant to inspect Grissom's car, a brown Toyota, which was found to be holding Brown and Rusch's credit cards, along with a 12-inch, red stained knife. Additionally witnesses who lived near Butler's apartment said they had seen a car similar to Grissom's parked outside of the apartment building in the days after the murder. This same vehicle was also spotted at the scene of an attempted abduction on June 12, in which case a woman named Michelle Katf was attacked in her bedroom by a man welding a gun. After a struggle between Katf and the man, the man fled and sped off in the vehicle, according to a witness named Thomas Haynes. Police searched through both of Grissom's storage lockers and collected numerous strands of hair on the floors. The hair strands were submitted to the Johnson County crime lab who compared the strands to hair collected from the women's hairbrushes, and the lab found a high probability the hairs found in the lockers belonged to the women. Finally, in the homes of Brown and Rusch police uncovered strands of male pubic hair, which contained DNA, and when it was compared to a DNA sample of Grissom, they were a match.

In early July, the FBI located Grissom hiding out in Texas, and 15 federal agents were dispatched there to arrest him. On July 7, they staked out an American Airlines terminal in Dallas for about 4 1⁄2 hours. At 9:45 a.m., they spotted Grissom and arrested him without incident. Grissom was then led to an interrogation room, where for about eight hours he was questioned by FBI agent Mike Napier and Leawood Police Detective Joe Langer, who pressed him about the incriminating evidence. According to both, Grissom, who did not confess nor deny abducting the women, stated he wanted a deal that could, according to him, "provide the whole package", and also request an attorney. It was found that he had been staying at a motel in Corpus Christi, and authorities searched through it, though no new evidence was found.

In late July, the KCTV news station in Kansas City, Missouri was sent an anonymous two-page letter, which offered to release the three women, whom the writer claimed were being held against their will, for an exchange of $1,500,000. The origins of the letter were investigated, and it contained a Chillicothe, Missouri postmark and a Brookfield, Missouri return address. David Burger of the Lenexa Police Department stated that the letter, "didn't attach any credence", and there was, "no validation to the demands". The writer was identified as 21-year-old Gary Lewis of Chillicothe. Johnson County investigators determined that Lewis was not holding the women against their will, did not have any connection with Grissom, nor was he connected to the case. Lewis admitted to writing the letter and was charged in court with attempted theft and falsely reporting a crime. Lewis said that he merely wrote the letter as a way to gain attention. In exchange for dropping the attempted theft charge, Lewis pleaded guilty to falsely reporting a crime, and judge Gerald Hougland imposed a maximum sentence of one year in prison and ordering Lewis to pay $1,500.

Despite that no trace of the women had yet been found, authorities had enough evidence to suggest that all three had been killed, and charged Grissom with three counts of first-degree murder, one count of aggravated kidnapping, four counts of aggravated robbery, two counts of aggravated burglary, one count of burglary and one count of theft. Grissom remained in a Dallas jail to await extradition to Kansas, however he attempted to fight his extradition and it would not be until November that he returned to Kansas.

Aftermath 
In March 1990, judge Robert Jones lowered Grissom's robbery charges from four counts of aggravated robbery to four counts of simple robbery. On March 14, Grissom entered a not guilty plea to the charges. He went to trial in November. The bodies of the three women were yet to be found, but on November 3, 1990, Grissom was found guilty of all charges. He was therefore sentenced to life in prison. The women's bodies have never been recovered, and Grissom has refused to offer information. He has also refused to offer information about the unsolved June 7, 1989 murder of 25-year-old Terri Renee Maness, a woman he had once dated.

Grissom's case was brought up during the 1990 Kansas gubernatorial election, when Republican governor Mike Hayden, who was seeking re-election, used the case as an example as to why capital punishment should be reinstated in Kansas. Hayden argued that if Grissom had been sentenced to death for the 1977 murder, then he would not have been able to kill the other three women. This sparked controversy as a lot of people, including former governor John William Carlin, pointed out that Grissom could not have received the death penalty at the time because he was a juvenile. Hayden would lose the election to Democratic opponent Joan Finney, but capital punishment was later reinstated in Kansas in 1994. In 1998 it was discovered that Grissom had joined an internet pen pal group dedicated to those incarcerated. Family members of his victims expressed their disappointment that such a website was allowed; Tim Butler, who was the brother of Joan Butler, wrote to the web site operators and said, "the monster Grissom forgot to mention his other hobbies: bludgeoning old ladies with railroad spikes and killing and torturing young women."

In August 1999, a team of searches from NecroSearch inc. scoured a landfill near Clinton Lake after theories about the women's bodies being buried there emerged. However, the search turned up no results. In 2010 The Wichita Eagle daily newspaper erroneously wished a happy birthday to Grissom, who had turned 50. This was seen by many as inappropriate, but the newspaper agency responded by explaining that they received no info about Grissom's background prior to the paper's publishing and that they had been a victim of a prank. In 2017, Grissom was accused of passing a sexually explicit note to a female corrections officer. While Grisson admitted to passing the note, he claimed the woman wanted him to. She denied it, and Grissom was to spend 30 days in segregation. He will not be eligible for parole until 2093.

In media

Books

Television 
The Discovery Channel TV show The New Detectives detailed Grissom's murder spree in the episode "Presumed Dead", that aired in 1999.
The true crime TV show On the Case with Paula Zahn examined Grissom's killings and subsequent arrest in the episode "Gone in an Instant", that aired in 2016.

See also 
 List of serial killers in the United States
 List of murder convictions without a body

References 

1960 births
1977 murders in the United States
1989 murders in the United States
20th-century American criminals
American male criminals
American people convicted of murder
American prisoners sentenced to life imprisonment
American serial killers
Crime in Kansas
Criminals from Kansas
Living people
Male serial killers
People convicted of murder by Kansas
Prisoners sentenced to life imprisonment by Kansas
Violence against women in the United States